QOR360 (pronounced ‘core 360’) is an American brand of  ergonomic chairs developed by the American physician, Turner Osler.

History 

Osler designed the chairs to rock and pivot when sat on, so as to stimulate  active sitting. With his son Lex, Osler launched the QOR360 and brought the chair into the market in 2016.

The Financial Times, in 2022, credited widespread working from home during the  COVID-19 pandemic for growing interest in the chairs.

Product
Each model of chair resembles a stool in which the seat purposely pivots and wobbles in every direction. The instability causes the sitter to keep both feet on the ground with knees below the hips and the spine straight. To remain stably seated, the sitter has to constantly use core muscles of the back and abdomen to make micro adjustments to posture and weight distribution. The active nature of sitting on the chair requires constant recruitment of core muscles. 

Osler designed the chairs after working 30 years as a trauma surgeon and then switching roles to a research epidemiologist, which was mostly a desk job. He made his own design because he was unable to find an ergonomic chair that did what he wanted it to do and that was also affordable. The main feature Osler invented and received a patent for was the dome-shaped rubber piece the chair seat rests on and that allows it to wobble and pivot. 

Designs and printable patterns were made freely available for a chair version called the "ButtOn" meant for classrooms and made out of plywood and a tennis ball for around eight dollars.

References

Ergonomics companies